Nordby is a Danish town, seat of the Fanø Municipality, in the Region of Southern Denmark. The population was 2,736 as of 1 January 2022.

Geography
Nordby is located on the island of Fanø (part of the Danish Wadden Sea Islands), by the North Sea and not too far from the city of Esbjerg.

It is by far the largest town on Fanø. Nordby also have the only ferry from Fanø to the danish mainland, with a 12 minute ferry to nearby Esbjerg. Many inhabitants in Nordby therefore work in Esbjerg and take the frequent ferry to get to and from work.

Religion

Nordby Church was built in 1786 and has historically been the church for the people of the sea from Fanø and a protestant church. Typical for island churches in the North Sea, including both churches on Fanø, Nordby Church does not have a large tower. Inside the church, numerous ship models hang to represent the island's maritime history.

References

External links

Municipal seats of the Region of Southern Denmark
Municipal seats of Denmark
Cities and towns in the Region of Southern Denmark
Fanø